Taraka, officially the Municipality of Taraka (Maranao: Inged a Taraka), is a 4th class municipality in the province of Lanao del Sur, Philippines. According to the 2020 census, it has a population of 27,184 people.

The oldest mosque and the second oldest mosque in the Philippines called Baab-Ur Rahman Masjid built in Lanao del Sur was located in the town.

Geography

Barangays

Taraka is politically subdivided into 43 barangays.

Climate

Demographics

Economy

References

External links
 Taraka Profile at the DTI Cities and Municipalities Competitive Index
 
 [ Philippine Standard Geographic Code]
Philippine Census Information
Local Governance Performance Management System

Municipalities of Lanao del Sur
Populated places on Lake Lanao